was a Japanese industrial engineer and businessman. He is considered to be the father of the Toyota Production System, which inspired Lean Manufacturing in the U.S. He devised the seven wastes (or muda in Japanese) as part of this system. He wrote several books about the system, including Toyota Production System: Beyond Large-Scale Production.

Life
Born in 1912 in Dalian, China, and a graduate of the Nagoya Technical High School (Japan), he joined the Toyoda family's Toyoda Spinning upon graduation in 1932 during the Great Depression thanks to the relations of his father to Kiichiro Toyoda, the son of Toyota's founding father Sakichi Toyoda. He moved to the Toyota motor company in 1943 where he worked as a shop-floor supervisor in the engine manufacturing shop of the plant, and gradually rose through the ranks to become an executive.

Influence
Ohno's principles influenced areas outside of manufacturing, and have been extended into the service arena.  For example, the field of sales process engineering has shown how the concept of Just In Time (JIT) can improve sales, marketing, and customer service processes.

Seven Wastes
Ohno was also instrumental in developing the way organizations identify waste, with his "Seven Wastes" model which have become core in many academic approaches. These wastes are:

1. Delay, waiting or time spent in a queue with no value being added 
2. Producing more than you need 
3. Over processing or undertaking non-value added activity 
4. Transportation 
5. Unnecessary movement or motion  
6. Inventory 
7. Defects in the Product.

Ten Precepts
Ohno is also known for his "Ten Precepts" to think and act to win.  
 You are a cost.  First reduce waste.  
 First say, "I can do it." And try before everything.  
 The workplace is a teacher.  You can find answers only in the workplace.  
 Do anything immediately. Starting something right now is the only way to win.  
 Once you start something, persevere with it. Do not give up until you finish it.  
 Explain difficult things in an easy-to-understand manner.  Repeat things that are easy to understand.  
 Waste is hidden.  Do not hide it.  Make problems visible.  
 Valueless motions are equal to shortening one's life.  
 Re-improve what was improved for further improvement.  
 Wisdom is given equally to everybody.  The point is whether one can exercise it.

See also

Just In Time (JIT)
Lean manufacturing

Published works
 Ohno, Taiichi (1988), Toyota Production System: Beyond Large-Scale Production, Productivity Press, 
 Ohno, Taiichi (1988), Workplace Management, Productivity Press, 
 Ohno, Taiichi  (2007), Workplace Management. Translated by Jon Miller, Gemba Press,

References

1912 births
1990 deaths
Quality experts
Japanese automotive pioneers
Toyota people